Rudolf Ferdinandovich Sivers (1892–1918) was a Russian revolutionary and military leader.

Sivers was born in Saint Petersburg on 23 November 1892.

A veteran of World War I, after the February Revolution he joined Bolshevik party and became a chief editor of "Entrenched Truth" newspaper in the 12th Army. At the end of July 1917 he was arrested by the Russian Provisional Government for defeatism, but was released during the October Revolution.

At the start of the Russian Civil War, Sivers led Red Guards and sailors in the battle at Pulkovo against forces of Krasnov–Kerensky. Soon thereafter in November 1917 along with his troops he was dispatched to Ukraine and the South Russia (Don River region). On 23 February 1918 Sivers' forces occupied Rostov-na-Donu and then Taganrog. In March – April 1918 Sivers was put in charge of the 2nd Special Army (originally the 5th Army) and fought against the advancing forces of Central Powers near Kharkiv and Kupyansk despite the Treaty of Brest-Litovsk. The army was eventually merged with the Voronezh Detachment.

Since summer of 1918 Sivers fought at the Russian Southern Front commanded the 1st Special Ukrainian Brigade as part of the 9th Army against the forces of Pyotr Krasnov. On 15 November 1918 he was mortally wounded in battle near Zhelnovka (today – Zhelunovo, Karachevsky District) and died on 8 December 1918. Sivers was buried at the Monument to the Fighters of the Revolution on the Field of Mars in Saint Petersburg.

External links
 Rudolf Sivers at the Saint Petersburg funeral website
 Yasenov, Ye. Rudolf Sivers in Donbas. "Donets News". 17 January 2011.

1892 births
1918 deaths
Military personnel from Saint Petersburg

Russian military personnel of World War I
Russian revolutionaries
Old Bolsheviks
Soviet people of the Ukrainian–Soviet War
Soviet military personnel of the Russian Civil War
Burials on the Field of Mars (Saint Petersburg)